Perpetual Peace or Eternal Peace may refer to:
Perpetual peace, a concept in Kantian philosophy
Perpetual Peace: A Philosophical Sketch by Immanuel Kant

Treaty of Perpetual Peace and similar may refer to:
Egyptian–Hittite peace treaty, instituting an "eternal peace" between the Hittite and Egyptian empires.
Perpetual Peace (532) (ἀπέραντος εἰρήνη), signed between the Byzantine and the Sassanid empires 
Ewiger Landfriede, a pax perpetua agreed at the Diet of Worms in 1495, which banned the right of vendetta in the Holy Roman Empire.
Treaty of Perpetual Peace (1502), between England and Scotland  
Perpetual Peace (1516), signed between the Swiss Confederacy and Francis I of France 
Treaty of Perpetual Peace (1534), between England and Scotland
Treaty of Perpetual Peace (1686), signed between Russia and Poland-Lithuania 
Entente Cordiale (1904), a frame agreement consisting of a number of treaties that were intended to create perpetual peace between United Kingdom and France

See also
Pax (liturgy)
Rest in peace
Eternal Rest
Pax Romana
List of periods of regional peace